Events from the year 2019 in Azerbaijan.

Incumbents 
 President: Ilham Aliyev
 Vice President: Mehriban Aliyeva
 Prime Minister: Novruz Mammadov (until 8 October), Ali Asadov (starting 8 October)

Events 
21–27 July: The 2019 European Youth Summer Olympic Festival is held in Baku.
8, 19 and 20 October: Protests in Baku.

Deaths 
9 May – Arif Malikov, composer

References 

 
Years of the 21st century in Azerbaijan
2010s in Azerbaijan
Azerbaijan